The 13th Kral TV Video Music Awards (Turkish: 13. Kral TV Video Müzik Ödülleri, or 13. Kral TV VMÖ) were organized by Kral TV at the İstanbul Gösteri Merkezi on Wednesday, May 9, 2007. The hosts were Oktay Kaynarca and Özgü Namal.

In previous years, award winners were determined by the vote of a jury. This year, the system changed, and winners were determined by the text message votes that viewers sent from their phones. The artist who won the most awards this year was Demet Akalın.

Winners and Nominees 

The award winners and nominees are shown in the table below.

References 

2007 in Turkey
2007 music awards